Georgia Lee is an American writer and director known for her 2006 film Red Doors. Lee has also written and directed episodes of The Expanse and The 100. She has also developed and serves as the showrunner for the Netflix series Partner Track based on the novel of the same name by Helen Wan.

Early life and education 
Lee was born in Philadelphia, Pennsylvania to immigrants from Taiwan. She was raised primarily in Waterford, Connecticut in the same house featured in her film Red Doors. She has a younger sister, Kathy Shao-Lin Lee.

Lee was ranked first in her senior year at Waterford High School. She attended Harvard University, where she received an A.B. in biochemistry. She took courses toward an MBA but did not complete the program. After graduation, Lee worked for the management consulting firm McKinsey & Company.

Career 
Lee apprenticed on Gangs of New York after its director Martin Scorsese saw Lee's first short film, The Big Dish. Lee's next short film was Educated (2001), which was shown in over 30 festivals around the world.

Lee wrote and directed the feature film Red Doors. It won the Best Narrative Feature Award in the NY, NY Competition at the 2005 Tribeca Film Festival. It also won the Special Jury Award for Ensemble Acting at CineVegas, and the Audience Award and the Grand Jury Award for Screenwriting at Outfest.

Lee has served as juror for both the Sundance Film Festival and Tribeca Film Festival.

Filmography

As director

As producer

See also
 List of female film and television directors
 List of LGBT-related films directed by women

References

External links 
 Filmmakers, official profile

American film directors
American people of Taiwanese descent
American screenwriters
American writers of Chinese descent
American women film directors
Harvard University alumni
McKinsey & Company people
Living people
1976 births
21st-century American women